Aaradhna Jayantilal Patel (born 20 December 1983), better known by her stage name Aaradhna, is a New Zealand singer, songwriter, musical recording artist. She made her musical debut in 2004 featuring on the single "Getting Stronger" with the group Adeaze which peaked at number one on the official New Zealand Singles Chart.

Biography

Early years
Aaradhna is a New Zealander of Samoan and Indian descent. Her father Jayanti Patel is an Indian from Navsari, Gujarat, India and her mother Sia'a Patel is Samoan from the villages of PapaSataua, Falealupo-uta & Auala.
Aaradhna is the eldest of five. 
She first showed singing aspirations at the young age of 11, singing along with her mother to traditional Samoan and country songs. She would try to imitate the songs she heard in Bollywood movies that she and her father watched and also went to festivals that her father performed at. Aaradhna began writing her own music at the age of 11; she entered her first talent quest at the age of 13 making it into the finals. She joined the school choir at Porirua College had got kicked out for rebelling, but went on to form a five piece girl group called "Lovera".

Career
Her debut album I Love You, entered the top 20 RIANZ and has various songs featured on feature films including the top 5 single "They Don't Know" featuring New Zealand hip-hop star Savage on Sione's Wedding and had also had another feature on the movie It's a Free World with her original song "Faith". Aaradhna released a club-inspired song alongside Australian producer, DJ & artist Paul Mac in late 2006 titled Love Declaration. The song features on Mac's album Panic Room. In Australia the single reached No. 31 on the local charts.

2008–present
Her album Sweet Soul Music, a throw-back to the soul classics including The Jackson 5 cover "I Want You Back" was released on iTunes and various music stores in New Zealand on 14 February 2008 coinciding with Valentine's Day.

In 2011 she began working on her third studio album under Dawn Raid Entertainment. She released the single "Wake Up" in August 2012, and the album Treble & Reverb was later released in November.

Patel's fourth studio album titled Brown Girl was released in July 2016. The album explored her own experience of casual racism in New Zealand. The album debuted at number one in New Zealand and also cracked the albums chart of Switzerland. In November 2016, the performer gave away her hip-hop award at the 2016 New Zealand Music Awards, believing that she had "been placed in this category, because I'm brown". She opined that "you can't give a singer an award for Best Hip Hop artist".

Discography

Studio albums

Singles

Featured singles

Notes

References

External links 
 AudioCulture profile
 
 
 Samoan Bios: Aaradhna
 Aaradhna on Bandcamp

1983 births
APRA Award winners
New Zealand people of Indian descent
New Zealand people of Samoan descent
New Zealand contemporary R&B singers
Dawn Raid Entertainment
Living people
Pacific Music Award-winning artists
Aaradhna
21st-century New Zealand  women singers